Patrick James Cain Sr. (October 1, 1962 – March 14, 2016) was an American football offensive lineman who played one season with the Detroit Lions of the National Football League. He first enrolled at California State Polytechnic University, Pomona before transferring to Wichita State University and attended Pomona High School in Arvada, Colorado. Cain was also a member of the Denver Dynamite and Washington Commandos of the Arena Football League. He was a member of the Denver Dynamite team that won ArenaBowl I. He died of lung cancer in 2016.

References

External links
Just Sports Stats

1962 births
2016 deaths
American football offensive linemen
Cal Poly Pomona Broncos football players
Deaths from cancer in Colorado
Denver Dynamite (arena football) players
Detroit Lions players
Players of American football from Denver
Washington Commandos players
Wichita State Shockers football players